Daniel Tudor may refer to:
 Daniel Tudor (footballer) (born 1974), Romanian football goalkeeper and coach
 Daniel Tudor (journalist) (born 1982), British journalist